Malahar Halt railway station is a halt railway station on the Howrah–New Jalpaiguri line of Katihar railway division of Northeast Frontier Railway Zone. It is situated beside National Highway 81, Belungaon of Malda district in the Indian state of West Bengal.

References

Railway stations in Malda district
Katihar railway division